This is a list of universities and colleges in the Republic of the Congo.

Higher Institute of Technology of Central Africa
Marien Ngouabi University
Denis sassou Nguesso University

Universities in the Republic of the Congo
Universities
Congo, Republic
Congo, Republic Of The